Born to Die is a 2012 album by Lana Del Rey.

Born to Die may also refer to:

Music

Albums
 Born to Die (Grand Funk Railroad album), 1976
Born to Die: The Paradise Edition, a 2012 reissue of the Lana Del Rey album

Songs
 "Born to Die" (song), the second single from Lana Del Rey's album of the same name
 "Born to Die", a 1974 single by Giorgio Moroder
 "Born to Die", a 1976 song by Grand Funk Railroad from the album Born to Die
 "Born to Die", a 1982 song by MDC from Millions of Dead Cops
 "Born to Die", a 1996 song by Choking Victim from Squatta's Paradise
 "Born to Die", a 1997 song by Anti-Flag and d.b.s. from North America Sucks!!
 "Born to Die", a 1997 song by Sevendust from Sevendust
 "And Am I Born to Die?", a hymn written in 1780 by Charles Wesley

Other uses
Born to Die, a 1974 SEC documentary on Yallourn
"Born to Die", a 1997 short story by Andy Griffiths from Just Tricking!

See also
 "Everyone's Born to Die", 2006 song by Electric Light Orchestra from On the Third Day
 "Born to Live, Born to Die", 1969 single by The Foundations
 "Born to Lie", 2017 song by Dreamcar from Dreamcar